Mustafa İslamoğlu (born 28 October 1960, in Develi, Kayseri), is a Turkish theologian, poet, writer. He also appears in religious shows of Diyanet TV.

He has studies and books about various topics such as literature, Islamic history, tafsir. He was criticised in Turkey for his ideas that promoted logic and science above tradition and denying the authority of certain hadith, who he saw to be fabricated. He argued that the use of hadith should be limited, applied only on topics that are already mentioned in the Qur'an but not in detail.

Sources 

20th-century Turkish poets
Turkish theologians
Turkish jurists
Turkish Quranist Muslims
1960 births
Living people
People from Develi